South Korea, as Republic of Korea, competed at the 1968 Winter Olympics in Grenoble, France. It consists of 2 women & 6 men.

Alpine skiing

Men

Men's slalom

Cross-country skiing

Men

Figure skating

Men

Women

Speed skating

Men

Women

References
Official Olympic Reports

Korea, South
1968
1968 in South Korean sport